

Events

Works

Births
 Hamdollah Mostowfi (died 1349), Iranian historian, geographer and epic poet

Deaths

13th-century poetry
Poetry